Because of You is a 1952 American drama romance film directed by Joseph Pevney and starred Loretta Young and Jeff Chandler. This film was surprising in that it showed a provocative "sexy side" of Miss Young, quite different from her usual dignified brunette "nice girl" part.

In late 1954, Jeff Chandler said this was his favorite among the films he had made.

Plot
Christine Carroll is preparing to marry her boyfriend. She finds out too late that her fiancé Mike is a gangster and, once he slips stolen merchandise into her purse, she becomes his unwitting accessory. Though she goes to jail, she is innocent of the crime.

Through the kindness of prison psychiatrist Dr. Breen, Christine turns her life around in prison, becoming a nurse's aide in the infirmary. Upon her release, Christine gets a job at a hospital, where she falls in love with wounded combat pilot Steve Kimberly, an architect from a good family. 

Christine's probation officer encourages her to tell him the truth. But his wounded psyche makes her decide to keep her past a secret, and they marry. She and Steve have a happy marriage and soon have a daughter.

Christine devotes herself to her husband and child.  All is wonderful until her old gangster boyfriend Mike, fresh out of prison, shows up. He is willing to let bygones be bygones as long as she drives him south of the border into Mexico. Trapped, she agrees. After another robbery, there is a high-speed chase and a crash.  Mike is killed. Christine and her daughter survive the wreck.

An enraged Steve accuses Christine of being a tramp and files for divorce, gaining full custody of the child. Christine takes a job as an assistant for a magician. One day she meets up with her sister-in-law, Steve's twin, who comes to her aid. Christine is asked to perform with the clown at a children's party. Since this is years later, the child does not know that Christine is her mother. She falls in love with the Magic Lady, who agrees to come to her house for a few days and show her some attention and love.  Unexpectedly, Steve comes home. Christine points out that their daughter has serious problems and needs the care of a mother. She leaves, ready to never see her child again.

Steve finds her at her parents' farm. Once he got over his anger at his sister's subterfuge, he searched his soul to realize that he needs Christine as an equal partner to share his life and to help their  daughter grow up to be a strong young woman.

Cast
 Loretta Young as Christine Carroll Kimberly
 Jeff Chandler as Steve Kimberly
 Alex Nicol as Mike Monroe
 Frances Dee as Susan Arnold
 Alexander Scourby as Dr. Breen
 Lynne Roberts as Rosemary Balder
 Gayle Reed as Kim Kimberly - age 6
 Mae Clarke as Miss Peach / Nurse Peachie
 Billy Wayne as George, Chauffeur / Butler
 Morris Ankrum as Dr. Travis
 Helen Wallace as Mrs. Gordon 
 Harry Mendoza as Bumbo (as Harry B. Mendoza)
 Vici Raaf as Vera
 Betty Reilly as Singer
 Bill Cassady as Patient

Production
In October 1951 Universal bought a story written originally for the screen: Magic Lady by Thelma Robinson and George Haight.

In March 1952 Universal announced the film would star Loretta Young and be based on a script by Ketti Frings, produced by Albert Cohen and directed by Joseph Pevney. The last time Young worked at Universal was in Ladies Courageous (1943). Later that month Jeff Chandler joined the film as Young's co star. It was Chandler's first romantic role.

Filming started on April 15, 1952.

Loretta Young said she found Jeff Chandler very attractive and he told her that he was falling in love with her. She further stated that the relationship never progressed beyond hand-holding outside their love scenes, "but I think until he died, we both felt it. If I'd see him on the street I'd walk the other way because I didn't want to spark anything."

In July the title was changed from Magic City to Because of You.

Music
The title song, "Because of You", was Tony Bennett's first hit recording, reaching #1 in 1951 and becoming one of his many signature songs.

Reception

Critical
The new York Times said "the acting and the direction are as soggy as the script."

Box Office
According to Loretta Young's biographer, "Because of You was a sleeper hit, a film that performs way beyond expectations and was held over a couple of weeks at the Roxy Theatre in New York."

Home media
In 1998 Universal released the film in 1998 on VHS tape. However, the movie has not had an official DVD release in any region. As a result, only bootleg DVD-R copies of the film exist, most of which are video transfers from the official VHS tape. In 2021 a Blu-ray of Because of You was released as part of Kino Lorber's Film Noir: The Dark Side of Cinema V box set.

See also
 List of American films of 1952

References

 Funk, Edward. ''Behind the Door: The Real Story of Loretta Young, Bear Manor Media, 2015.

External links
 
 
 
 
 

1952 films
Films directed by Joseph Pevney
Film noir
American romantic drama films
American black-and-white films
Films set in the United States
Films shot in the United States
Universal Pictures films
Films scored by Frank Skinner
1952 drama films
1950s English-language films
1950s American films